Bill Thies is an American computer scientist and senior principal researcher at Microsoft Research India and the recipient of the 2016 MacArthur Fellowship.

Career 
He started with Microsoft Research India in 2008 and is a senior principal researcher there. His research and analysis has appeared in many print publications including ACM Transactions on Computer-Human Interaction, Information and Communication Technologies and Development (ICTD) and others.

As a computer scientist, his work at the Microsoft Research unit in Bangalore, India focuses on how to use technology to aid global development. He has helped to create the 99DOTS initiative, a model for delivering tuberculosis medicine to those in India. He also helped to create and implement CGNet Swara in collaboration with Indian journalists, to enable isolated tribal communities to have a way to communicate needs with government officials.

Education 
Thies graduated from the State College Area High School in 1997 and moved to Massachusetts to continue his studies. He studied at the Massachusetts Institute of Technology, earning two Bachelors degrees (in Computer Science and Maths) in 2001, a Master's degree in 2002, and a Ph.D. in 2009. His Ph.D. was in computer science and engineering.

Recognition 
In 2009, Thies received the John C. Reynolds Doctoral Dissertation Award. He has received the CHI Best Paper Award and, In 2016, he was included as one of the MacArthur Fellowship Grant recipients.

References 

American computer scientists
MacArthur Fellows
Massachusetts Institute of Technology alumni